This is a list of people from the City of Westminster, England who have become known internationally in different roles and professions. The City of Westminster is a central London borough and is the wealthiest borough in England.

 Adam Ant
 Benedict Arnold
 Jane Asher
 Alfred Jules Ayer
 Charles Babbage
 Francis Beaufort
 Jane Birkin
 Isabella Blow
 David Cameron
 Bertie Carvel
 Richard Tappin Claridge
 William Coldstream
 Wilkie Collins
 Dan Costa (composer)
 Nipper Pat Daly
 Amelia Dimoldenberg
 Cara Delevingne
 Charles Dickens
 Jacqueline du Pré
 T. S. Eliot
 Elizabeth II (1926–2022), Queen of the United Kingdom
 Noel Fielding
 Clement Freud
 Gary Glitter
 Edward Gibbon
 Hughie Green
 Richard Hammond
 Alexander Hewat
 Tom Hiddleston
 Christian Jessen
 Belinda Lang
 Edward Lear
 Dua Lipa
 Madonna
 Hayley Mills
 Margie Morris
 Jonathan Myles-Lea
 Henry Neele
 Annie Newton
 Pitt the Elder
 Elizabeth Press (1920–2008), immunologist
 Stuart Price
 Patrick Procktor
 Corin Redgrave
 George Reynolds
 Wendy Richard
 Daisy Ridley
 Talulah Riley
 Isabella Frances Romer
 Tom Sandars
 Dodie Smith
 Stephen Spender
 Cat Stevens
 Stephen Ward
 H. G. Wells
 Charles Wesley
 Norman Wisdom

References

Westminster